The 1958 FA Charity Shield was the 36th FA Charity Shield, a football match between the winners of the previous season's First Division and FA Cup titles. This year's match was contested by league champions Wolverhampton Wanderers and FA Cup winners Bolton Wanderers. 

The match was staged at Bolton's home ground, Burnden Park. The hosts won the game 4–1, giving them their only Shield win.

Match details

References

1958
Charity Shield 1958
Charity Shield 1958
FA Charity Shield
FA Charity Shield